1874 in sports describes the year's events in world sport.

American football
College championship
 College football national championship – Yale Bulldogs 
Events
 Harvard Crimson plays McGill Redmen under rules taken from both association football and rugby football: it is hence arguably the first game of American football as a distinctive code

Association football
England
 FA Cup final – Oxford University 2–0 Royal Engineers at Kennington Oval, London.  The Oval becomes the regular venue for the FA Cup Final with this game, after Lillie Bridge was used in 1873.  All finals until 1892 are played at The Oval.
 March — Aston Villa founded by the Villa Cross Wesleyan Chapel near Aston Park in Birmingham.
 Bolton Wanderers founded as a Sunday School team at Christ Church, Blackburn Street, Bolton.
 The Football Association makes a rule change so that teams change ends at half time.
 The first shin pads are introduced.
Scotland
 21 March — inaugural Scottish Cup final is won 2–0 by Queen's Park against Clydesdale at Hampden Park, Glasgow.
 Hearts, Greenock Morton and  Hamilton Academical all founded.

Baseball
National championship
 National Association of Professional Base Ball Players champion – Boston Red Stockings (third consecutive season)

Boxing
Events
 No major bouts take place in 1874.  Tom Allen retains the American Championship.

Cricket
Events
 W. G. Grace becomes the first player to perform the double in an English season.  In 21 first-class matches, he scores 1664 runs and takes 140 wickets.
England
 Champion County –  Gloucestershire
 Most runs – W. G. Grace 1664 @ 52.00 (HS 179)
 Most wickets – W. G. Grace 140 @ 12.70 (BB 7–18)

Golf
Major tournaments
 British Open – Mungo Park

Horse racing
England
 Grand National – Reugny
 1,000 Guineas Stakes – Apology
 2,000 Guineas Stakes – Atlantic
 The Derby – George Frederick
 The Oaks – Apology
 St. Leger Stakes – Apology
Australia
 Melbourne Cup – Haricot
Canada
 Queen's Plate – The Swallow
Ireland
 Irish Grand National – Sailor
 Irish Derby Stakes – Ben Battle
USA
 Preakness Stakes – Culpepper
 Belmont Stakes – Saxon

Ice hockey
Events
 The Montreal Victorias hockey club, members of the Victoria Skating Club, begin play of ice hockey at the Victoria Skating Rink, leading to the first organized indoor game in 1875. The club does not formally exist until several years later, in 1877 or 1881.

Rowing
The Boat Race
 28 March — Cambridge wins the 31st Oxford and Cambridge Boat Race

Rugby football
Events
 Coventry RFC, Newport RFC and Swansea RFC are all established in 1874

References

 
Sports by year